Motagua vs. Real España, is a classic football match played between Motagua from Tegucigalpa and Real España from San Pedro Sula, two of the most successful and popular football teams in Honduras.  The Motagua–Real España classic is not as fierce as other derbies as these two teams have a good relationship with each other; from the players, to the board and the fans.  However, they had played seven intense league finals, four won by Real España and three by Motagua.  These two teams played the first ever final in Liga Nacional in the 1974–75 season.

The finals
Motagua and Real España had played seven finals since the beginning of the Professional League in 1965–66, 4 won by Real España and 3 by Motagua.

1974–75

 España won 1–0 on aggregate. Played in one leg.

1976–77

 España won 4–1 on aggregate.

1978–79

 Motagua won 5–1 on aggregate.

1990–91

 Real España won 2–1 on aggregate.

1991–92

 Motagua won 1–0 on aggregate.

1997–98

 Motagua won 5–1 on aggregate.

2017–18

 Real España won 3–2 on aggregate.

Head to Head
 As of 29 November 2020
 At Tegucigalpa

 At San Pedro Sula

 At Estadio Olímpico only

 In neutral venue

 Overall

Trivia
 First game in Liga Nacional: Held on 5 September 1965 at San Pedro Sula, Motagua defeated España 0–2 with two goals from Elio Banegas.
 Motagua's largest home win: 7–1 in 2015–16.
 Real España's largest away win: 2–4 in 2007–08.
 First game at Tegucigalpa: Motagua 1–1 España in 1965–66.
 First Real España's home win: 2–0 in 1966–67.
 Motagua's largest away win: 0–4 in 1999–00.
 Real España's largest home win: 5–0 in 2014–15.
 Motagua's best goalscorer against Real España: Rubilio Castillo with 13 goals.
 Real España's best goalscorer against Motagua: Jimmy Bailey with 10 goals.
 Players that had score with both teams: Júnior Costly, Miguel Matthews, Gilberto Yearwood, Geovanny Ávila and Pedro Santana.

References

External links
 Motagua
 Real España

Association football rivalries in Honduras
F.C. Motagua
Real C.D. España